Lisa Linnea Brolander (born 4 December 1990), best known under her stage name Moonica Mac, is a Swedish singer and songwriter. Born in Dalarna and raised in Torsång, her stage name is a combination of the names of the performers Monica Zetterlund and Fleetwood Mac. Along with Benjamin Ingrosso she in 2021 released the song "Det stora röda huset".

In 2021, Mac was one of the singers in the twelfth season of Så mycket bättre, broadcast on TV4.

Discography

Studio albums

Singles

Other charting songs

References

1990 births
21st-century Swedish women singers
Artists from Dalarna
Living people
People from Borlänge Municipality
Swedish pop singers
Swedish women singer-songwriters